A Dialogue on Personal Identity and Immortality is a book by the philosopher John Perry.
It has been translated into Spanish, Chinese, Persian and Korean.

Content
It deals with standard problems in the theory of personal identity in the form of a dialogue between a terminally ill university professor at a small Midwestern college, Gretchen Weirob, and her two friends, Sam Miller and Dave Cohen. The views represented include those of Bernard Williams, John Locke, and Derek Parfit. The format of associating different philosophical positions with different characters in a dialogue recalls David Hume's Dialogues Concerning Natural Religion.

Reception
David M. Rosenthal believes that the book is appropriate for both professionals and students because it "makes a complicated topic stimulating and accessible without any sacrifice of scholarly accuracy or thoroughness."

References

External links
 
 
 Excerpt

Dialogue on Personal Identity and Immortality
Personal Identity and Immortality
Cognitive science literature
1978 non-fiction books
Identity (philosophy)
Immortality